The Carltona doctrine (or Carltona principle) expresses the idea that, in United Kingdom law, the acts of government departmental officials are synonymous with the actions of the minister in charge of that department. The point was established in Carltona Ltd v Commissioners of Works.

The judgment in Carltona

Faced with the requisition of their factory by the wartime government, the factory owners raised a judicial review action to challenge the legality of the requisition order. The order had been made under the auspices of the Defence (General) Regulations 1939, which authorised the Commissioners of Works to requisition such land as they deemed necessary in the national interest. The Regulations specified that the Commissioner's powers were exercisable by, inter alia the Minister of Works and Planning. The factory owners sought to argue that the requisition was invalid because the order had not in fact been signed by the minister, but by an official within the Ministry of Works and Planning. In rejecting this contention, the Master of the Rolls, Lord Greene, acknowledged the realities of government in the 20th century:

This statement of the way government operates has only become more true in recent decades as increased state interventionism and juridification have produced a rapid growth in the use of delegated legislation. Clearly, confronted with this reality, it would have been preposterous for the court to construe the wording of the Regulations so narrowly that only the minister, in person, could exercise the powers. Thus Lord Greene explained that, "Constitutionally, the decision of such an official is, of course, the decision of the minister."

The essence of the Carltona doctrine, therefore, lies in the elision of the identity of departmental officials with the relevant minister. It is not the case that the minister has delegated his decision-making power to a subordinate and therefore the doctrine achieves consistency with the principle that Parliament's delegatees have, unless specifically provided by statute, no power to delegate (delegatus non potest delegare).

Lord Greene proceeded to reconcile this with the doctrine of parliamentary accountability on the basis that:

Scope of the rule

Despite suggestions to the contrary by some academic commentators, it seems that there is no restriction on the applicability of the doctrine on account of the nature of the power being wielded. In HMA v. Copeland it was opined, by the highest criminal court in Scotland that: "... there is no obligation on the minister to exercise his powers personally even when those powers involve a serious invasion of the freedom or property rights of the subject". However, in some instances, Parliament has chosen to statutorily override this position by providing that the relevant minister must exercise the power in person.

Modern development
The Supreme Court of the United Kingdom dealt with the application of the Carltona doctrine in R v Adams, 2020 UKSC 19. In 1973, Gerry Adams, an Irish politician, was detained without trial by an interim custody order made under Article 4 of the Detention of Terrorists (Northern Ireland) Order 1972. It was later revealed that the Order required the Secretary of State to have considered the matter personally. Adams challenged the validity of the decision, arguing that the Secretary of State had failed to do so.  The issue before the Supreme Court was whether the Carltona principle operated to permit the making of such an Order by a Minister of State (para 8). Lord Kerr, delivering a unanimous judgment, held that the wording of the 1972 Order was clear to exclude the application of the Carltona doctrine (paras 31-32). Besides, in light of the seriousness of the consequences of the decision, the decision ought to be made by the Secretary of State personally (para 38). There was also no evidence that it would create an undue burden on the Secretary of State (para 39).

As to whether there is a general presumption in law that Carltona doctrine shall apply, Lord Kerr suggested that:

Daly has suggested that the above quotation is merely obiter dictum and a misunderstanding of the law. The Carltona doctrine merely reflects the constitutional reality that ministers act through their civil servants. The case itself broke no new ground and merely applied the established principles.

Ireland 

The Supreme Court of Ireland has confirmed that the Carltona doctrine applies to its fullest extent to the Irish civil service also- see Devanney v Shields [1998] 2 I.R. 230.

See also

Civil Service

References

Further reading

 Freedland  'The Rule Against Delegation and the Carltona Doctrine in an Agency Context'  [1996] Public Law 19
 Freedland  'Privatising Carltona: Part II of the Deregulation and Contracting Out Act 1994'  [1995] Public Law 21
 Lanham  'Delegation and the Alter Ego Principle'  (1984) 100 Law Quarterly Review 587

External links
UK Government departments - how they work - Official UK Government site
The Civil Service explained - Official UK Government site

Legal doctrines and principles
United Kingdom administrative law